Achanuragantha Veedu is a 2006 Indian Malayalam-language drama film directed by Lal Jose and written by Babu Janardhanan. It stars Salim Kumar, Muktha, Samvrutha Sunil, and Indrajith Sukumaran. The film was released on 28 January 2006. For his performance, Salim Kumar won the Kerala State Film Award for Second Best Actor.

Plot

Samuel after his wife's death faces hardship raising his three daughters. The story takes a mysterious route when his youngest daughter disappears.

Cast 
 Salim Kumar as Samuel / Prabhakaran
 Muktha as Lisamma Samuel
 Samvrutha Sunil as Sherly Samuel
 Suja Karthika as Tressa Samuel
 Usha as Lillykutty
 Indrajith Sukumaran
 Murali as Shekharan Nair
 Sadiq 
T.S Raju as S.P Thomas Mathew
 Madhu Warrier as Gopy
 Manikandan Pattambi as Maniyappan
Dinesh Prabhakar as Rajeev
 Prasanth as Tommy
 Harisree Ashokan as Johnykutty
 Baby Nayanthara as Nayana John
 Manka Mahesh as Saramma
 Ambika Mohan as Harikrishnan's mother
 Bindu Ramakrishnan as School principal
 Cherthala Lalitha as Devaki
 Radhika as Harikrishnan's Wife
 Prithviraj Sukumaran as Harikrishnan (cameo appearance)

Production
The story came to Janardhanan's mind after he watched the Suryanelli rape case proceedings. The film portrayed Pentecostal denomination quite extensively. It was shot in Peermade in Kerala.

Reception
The film received positive critical reception, particularly noted for Salim Kumar's transformation from a comedian to serious roles.

Sequel
A sequel titled Lisammayude Veedu was later produced in 2013. It was written and directed by Babu Janardhanan.

References

External links 
 
 Achanurangaatha Veedu at the Malayalam Movie Database

2006 films
Indian family films
2000s Malayalam-language films
Veedu
Films shot in Munnar
Films directed by Lal Jose